In algebraic topology, a branch of mathematics, a spectrum is an object representing a generalized cohomology theory. Every such cohomology theory is representable, as follows from Brown's representability theorem. This means that, given a cohomology theory,there exist spaces  such that evaluating the cohomology theory in degree  on a space  is equivalent to computing the homotopy classes of maps to the space , that is.Note there are several different categories of spectra leading to many technical difficulties, but they all determine the same homotopy category, known as the stable homotopy category. This is one of the key points for introducing spectra because they form a natural home for stable homotopy theory.

The definition of a spectrum

There are many variations of the definition: in general, a spectrum is any sequence  of pointed topological spaces or pointed simplicial sets together with the structure maps , where  is the smash product.

For other definitions, see symmetric spectrum and simplicial spectrum.

Homotopy groups of a spectrum 
One of the most important invariants of spectra are the homotopy groups of the spectrum. These groups mirror the definition of the stable homotopy groups of spaces since the structure of the suspension maps is integral in its definition. Given a spectrum  define the homotopy group  as the colimitwhere the maps are induced from the composition of the suspension map  and the structure map . A spectrum is said to be connective if its  are zero for negative k.

Examples

Eilenberg–Maclane spectrum 

Consider singular cohomology  with coefficients in an abelian group . We write this asThen the corresponding spectrum  has -th space ; it is called the Eilenberg–MacLane spectrum. Note this construction can be used to embed any ring  into the category of spectra. This embedding forms the basis of used Spectral geometry as a model for Derived algebraic geometry. One of the important properties found in this embedding are the isomorphismsshowing the category of spectra keeps track of the derived information of commutative rings, where the smash product acts as the derived tensor product. Moreover, the Eilenberg–Maclane spectrum can be used to define theories such as Topological Hochschild homology for commutative rings, which gives a more refined theory of the classical Hochschild homology.

Topological complex K-theory 
As a second important example, consider topological K-theory. At least for X compact,  is defined to be the Grothendieck group of the monoid of complex vector bundles on X. Also,  is the group corresponding to vector bundles on the suspension of X. Topological K-theory is a generalized cohomology theory, so it gives a spectrum. There is a corresponding construction using real vector bundles instead of complex vector bundles, which gives an 8-periodic spectrum.

Sphere spectrum 

One of the quintessential examples of a spectrum is the sphere spectrum . This is a spectrum whose homotopy groups are given by the stable homotopy groups of spheres, soWe can write down this spectrum explicitly as  where .

Thom spectra 

Another canonical example of spectra come from the Thom spectra representing various cobordism theories. This includes real cobordism , complex cobordism , framed cobordism, spin cobordism , string cobordism , and so on. In fact, for any topological group  there is a Thom spectrum .

Suspension spectrum 
A spectrum may be constructed out of a space. The suspension spectrum of a space , denoted  is a spectrum  (the structure maps are the identity.) For example, the suspension spectrum of the 0-sphere is the sphere spectrum discussed above. In fact, it defines a functorfrom the homotopy category of CW complexes to the homotopy category of spectra. The morphisms are given bywhich by the Freudenthal suspension theorem eventually stabilizes. By this we mean and for some finite integer . For a CW complex  there is an inverse construction  which takes a spectrum  and forms a spacecalled the infinite loop space of the spectrum. For a CW complex and this construction comes with an inclusion  for every , hence gives a mapwhich is injective. Unfortunately, these two structures, with the addition of the smash product, lead to significant complexity in the theory of spectra because there cannot exist a single category of spectra which satisfies a list of five axioms relating these structures. The above adjunction is valid only in the homotopy categories of spaces and spectra, but not always with a specific category of spectra (not the homotopy category).

Ω-spectrum 
An Ω-spectrum is a spectrum such that the adjoint of the structure map (i.e., the map) is a weak equivalence. The K-theory spectrum of a ring is an example of an Ω-spectrum.

Ring spectrum 
A ring spectrum is a spectrum X such that the diagrams that describe ring axioms in terms of smash products commute "up to homotopy" ( corresponds to the identity.) For example, the spectrum of topological K-theory is a ring spectrum. A module spectrum may be defined analogously.

For many more examples, see the list of cohomology theories.

Functions, maps, and homotopies of spectra

There are three natural categories whose objects are spectra, whose morphisms are the functions, or maps, or homotopy classes defined below.

A function between two spectra E and F is a sequence of maps from En to Fn that commute with the 
maps ΣEn → En+1 and ΣFn → Fn+1.

Given a spectrum , a subspectrum  is a sequence of subcomplexes that is also a spectrum. Intuitively such a map of spectra does not need to be everywhere defined, just eventually become defined, and two maps that coincide on a cofinal subspectrum are said to be equivalent.  
This gives the category of spectra (and maps), which is a major tool.

A homotopy of maps between spectra corresponds to a map , where  is the disjoint union  with  taken to be the basepoint. 
 
The stable homotopy category, or homotopy category of (CW) spectra is defined to be the category whose objects are spectra and whose morphisms are homotopy classes of maps between spectra.   Many other definitions of spectrum, some appearing very different, lead to equivalent stable homotopy categories.

This translation suspension is invertible, as we can desuspend too, by setting .

The triangulated homotopy category of spectra

The stable homotopy category is additive: maps can be added by using a variant of the track addition used to define homotopy groups. Thus homotopy classes from one spectrum to another form an abelian group.  Furthermore the stable homotopy category is triangulated (Vogt (1970)), the shift being given by suspension and the distinguished triangles by the mapping cone sequences of spectra 
.

Smash products of spectra

The smash product of spectra extends the smash product of CW complexes. It makes the stable homotopy category into a monoidal category; in other words it behaves like the (derived) tensor product of abelian groups. A major problem with the smash product is that obvious ways of defining it make it associative and commutative only up to homotopy. Some more recent definitions of spectra, such as symmetric spectra, eliminate this problem, and give a symmetric monoidal structure at the level of maps, before passing to homotopy classes.

The smash product is compatible with the triangulated category structure. In particular the smash product of a distinguished triangle with a spectrum is a distinguished triangle.

Generalized homology and cohomology of spectra

We can define the (stable) homotopy groups of a spectrum to be those given by 
,
We define the generalized homology theory of a spectrum E by

and define its generalized cohomology theory by

Here  can be a spectrum or (by using its suspension spectrum) a space.

Technical complexities with spectra 
One of the canonical complexities while working with spectra and defining a category of spectra comes from the fact each of these categories cannot satisfy five seemingly obvious axioms concerning the infinite loop space of a spectrum sendinga pair of adjoint functors , the and the smash product  in both the category of spaces and the category of spectra. If we let  denote the category of based, compactly generated, weak Hausdorff spaces, and  denote a category of spectra, the following five axioms can never be satisfied by the specific model of spectra:

  is a symmetric monoidal category with respect to the smash product 
 The functor  is left-adjoint to 
 The unit for the smash product  is the sphere spectrum 
 Either there is a natural transformation  or a natural transformation  which commutes with the unit object in both categories, and the commutative and associative isomorphisms in both categories.

Because of this, the study of spectra is fractured based upon the model being used. For an overview, check out the article cited above.

History

A version of the concept of a spectrum was introduced in the 1958 doctoral dissertation of Elon Lages Lima. His advisor Edwin Spanier wrote further on the subject in 1959. Spectra were adopted by Michael Atiyah and George W. Whitehead in their work on generalized homology theories in the early 1960s.  The 1964 doctoral thesis of J. Michael Boardman gave a workable definition of a category of spectra and of maps (not just homotopy classes) between them, as useful in stable homotopy theory as the category of CW complexes is in the unstable case.  (This is essentially the category described above, and it is still used for many purposes: for other accounts, see Adams (1974) or Rainer Vogt (1970).)    Important further theoretical advances have however been made since 1990, improving vastly the formal properties of spectra.  Consequently, much recent literature uses modified definitions of spectrum: see Michael Mandell et al. (2001) for a unified treatment of these new approaches.

See also 
Ring spectrum
Symmetric spectrum
G-spectrum
Mapping spectrum
Suspension (topology)
Adams spectral sequence

References

Introductory

Modern articles developing the theory

Historically relevant articles

External links 
Spectral Sequences - Allen Hatcher - contains excellent introduction to spectra and applications for constructing Adams spectral sequence
An untitled book project about symmetric spectra

Homotopy theory